Enkapune Ya Muto, also known as Twilight Cave, is a Late Stone Age site on the Mau Escarpment of Kenya. Beads made of perforated ostrich egg shells found at the site have been dated to 40,000 years ago. The beads found at the site represent the early human use of personal ornaments.

See also
 List of Stone Age art
 Eburran industry

References

External links
 Enkapune Ya Muto (Kenya)

Paleoanthropological sites
Archaeological sites in Kenya
Rock shelters
Archaeological sites of Eastern Africa
Stone Age Africa